William Nathaniel Phillips (15 February 1911 – 1 September 1992) was a Scottish professional footballer who played as an inside left in the Scottish League for Dundee and Heart of Midlothian.

Career statistics

References 

Place of birth missing
Scottish footballers
Brentford F.C. wartime guest players
Heart of Midlothian F.C. players
Scottish Football League players
1911 births
1992 deaths
Association football inside forwards
Dundee F.C. players
St Johnstone F.C. players